Sherilyn may refer to:

Sherilyn Dunstall, the pen name used by Australian sisters Sherylyn and Karen Dunstall
Sherilyn Fenn (born 1965), American actress and author
Sherilyn C. Fritz, researcher into paleoclimate and paleoecology
Sherilyn Peace Garnett (born 1969), American attorney, judge of the Los Angeles County Superior Court
Sherilyn McCoy or Sheri McCoy (born 1959), American scientist and business executive
Sherilyn Reyes-Tan (born 1975), Filipina actress
Melinda Sherilyn Wang (born 1990), Taiwanese-American figure skater
Sherilyn Williams-Stroud, geologist
Sherilyn Wolter (born 1951), American former actress

See also
Cheryl Lynn
Sherry Lynn